Leise Maersk was a diesel-powered cargo ship, which made the first voyage for the Maersk Line.

Construction and modifications
Leise Maersk was built in 1921 in the Odense Steel Shipyard and was the first diesel-powered vessel in the Maersk fleet.

Specifications
Leise Maearsk had a long stroke four-cycle diesel engine generating 1500 ihp, which translated to 1150 shp at 85 rpm, turning a single screw.

Career

Early career
The ship's first captain was C Thygesen.

Armenia aid
In 1922, the ship bought donated relief goods for Armenians from New York to Constantinople, including an entire ambulance train, 11 tractors, four trucks and various farm machinery and implements.

Maersk Line service
The Maersk Line was established in Maersk's New York office as an agreement was make with the Ford Motor Company to transport car parts from North American factories to assembly plants in Japan. As a result, starting on 12 July 1928 Leise Maersk made a voyage from Baltimore to New York and Savannah before passing through the Panama canal after which the ship called at San Pedro and Los Angeles. She then crossed the pacific, arriving in Yokohama on 10 September before continuing to Manila and Iloilo.

Labor Day hurricane
On 2 September 1935 Leise Maersk was near Florida when the Labor Day hurricane struck the area. The force of the hurricane lifted the ship over Alligator Reef, she was grounded 4 miles away. There was no loss of life and she was salvaged on 20 September 1935.

World War II
In 1940, the Leise Maersk was transferred to the Ministry of War Transport and participated in North Atlantic convoys. In 1940 she sailed out from Sydney, Nova Scotia, Canada carrying 4500 tons of grain and general cargo to Sharpness as part of convoy SC 11. On 23 November, she was torpedoed  by the Kriegsmarine submarine U-100 and sunk west of the Outer Hebrides. Seventeen of her 24-man crew were lost, with the survivors being rescued by a Dutch salvage tug and taken to Campbeltown.

References

Ships built in Odense
1921 ships
Merchant ships of Denmark
Ships of the Maersk Line
Maritime incidents in November 1940